Julia Freeman may refer to:

 Julia Wheelock Freeman (1833–1900), American missionary
 Julia Freeman (cyclist) (born 1963), English cyclist
 Julia Freeman (Arrowverse), a character in the Arrowverse franchise